Marcelo de Freitas Costa (born 1 June 1994), commonly known as Marcelo Freitas, is a Brazilian footballer who plays as a midfielder for Londrina.

References

External links
 Profile at kicker.de
 

1994 births
Living people
People from Limeira
Brazilian footballers
Brazilian expatriate footballers
Brazilian expatriate sportspeople in Germany
Expatriate footballers in Germany
Brazilian expatriate sportspeople in Portugal
Expatriate footballers in Portugal
Association football midfielders
Dynamo Dresden II players
FC Energie Cottbus players
Chemnitzer FC players
C.D. Nacional players
3. Liga players
Regionalliga players
FC Oberlausitz Neugersdorf players
Inter Leipzig players
Footballers from São Paulo (state)